Alankaragedara Viraj Lakshitha Madushan (born 11 June 1992) is a Sri Lankan cricketer. He made his first-class debut for Sri Lanka Army Sports Club in the 2012–13 Premier Trophy on 1 February 2013.

In March 2018, he was named in Galle's squad for the 2017–18 Super Four Provincial Tournament.

References

External links
 

1992 births
Living people
Sri Lankan cricketers
Sri Lanka Army Sports Club cricketers
Sportspeople from Kandy